The British Interplanetary Society (BIS), founded in Liverpool in 1933 by Philip E. Cleator, is the oldest existing space advocacy organisation in the world. Its aim is exclusively to support and promote astronautics and space exploration.

Structure
It is a non-profit organisation with headquarters in London and is financed by members' contributions.

It is situated on South Lambeth Road (A203) near Vauxhall station.

History
The BIS was only preceded in astronautics by the American Interplanetary Society (founded 1930), the German VfR (founded 1927), and Soviet Society for Studies of Interplanetary Travel (founded 1924), but unlike those it never became absorbed into a national industry. Thus it is now the world's oldest existing space advocacy body.

When originally formed in October 1933, the BIS aimed not only to promote and raise the public profile of astronautics, but also to undertake practical experimentation into rocketry along similar lines to the organisations above. However, early in 1936 the Society discovered that this ambition was thwarted by the Explosives Act of 1875, which prevented any private testing of liquid-fuel rockets in the United Kingdom.

Proposals for design of space vehicles
In the late 1930s, the group devised a project of landing people on the Moon by a multistage rocket, each stage of which would have many narrow solid-fuel rockets. Their lander was gumdrop-shaped but otherwise quite like the Lunar Module. As it was considered that the cabin would have to rotate, BIS member Ralph A. Smith, who helped re-establish the society post-WW2, invented the first instrument for space travel: the Coelostat, a navigation mechanism that would ingeniously cancel out the rotating view. R.A. Smith and Harry Ross were the aerospace visionaries named on the original patent. Smith also authored and illustrated the 1947 book 'The Exploration of the Moon' showing the first ever conceptual 'orbital satellite' (text by Arthur C. Clarke), which is said to have inspired both John F. Kennedy and Stanley Kubrick.

In a November 1949 conference in the BIS, Harry Ross presented a paper on a concept of a Lunar spacesuit. In the paper, Ross had examined the problem of a 68 kg lunar space suit which could be worn for up to 12 hours, within the temperature range of +120°C to -150°C. 

In 1946, the BIS started a programme known as Megaroc. The purpose of the programme was to develop a Sub-orbital spaceflight that could provide crewed ascents to a maximum of 1 million feet (304 km). The craft was made by enlarging and re-designing a V-2 rocket after it was noted by H.E. Ross in 1946 that the V-2 rocket was "nearly big enough to carry a man." The project was noted to be 10 years ahead of its time by NASA engineers who reviewed it. The same NASA engineers predicted the rocket would have been capable of first achieving a crewed suborbital flight between 1949 and 1951, and capable of sending people to space reliably by 1951.

Role in international space

During the second International Astronautical Congress, held in London in 1951, the BIS was one of 13 national space societies who together founded the International Astronautical Federation. The other founding members no longer exist as national societies, leaving only the BIS.

Nearest stars
In 1978, the Society published a starship study called Project Daedalus, which was a detailed feasibility study for a simple uncrewed interstellar flyby mission to Barnard's Star using present-day technology and a reasonable extrapolation of near-future capabilities. Daedalus was to have used a pellet driven nuclear-pulse fusion rocket to accelerate to 12 per cent of the speed of light.

Mars
The latest in this series of far-reaching studies produced the Project Boreas report, which designed a crewed station for the Martian North Pole. The report was short-listed for the 2007 Sir Arthur Clarke Awards in the category of Best Written Presentation.

Publications
The BIS publishes the academic journal Journal of the British Interplanetary Society and the monthly magazine Spaceflight. In 2008, the BIS published Interplanetary, a history of the society to date.

Awards given by the society
The science and science fiction writer Arthur C. Clarke was a well-known former Chairman of the British Interplanetary Society. The society was presented with the first Special Award, from the 2005 Sir Arthur Clarke Awards. This was a gift of Clarke's choice, independent of the judging panel. In 2008 the Society's magazine, Spaceflight, edited by Clive Simpson, was the winner of the award for Best Space Reporting.

Charles Chilton joined the society before writing and producing the science-fiction radio trilogy Journey Into Space.

Arms

See also
 Archibald Low, one of the founder members of the BIS and its President from 1936–1951.
 British space programme
 National Space Centre
 Project Daedalus
 Project Boreas
 Project Icarus
 Megaroc

References

Further reading

External links
 British Interplanetary Society website

Scientific organizations established in 1993
Space programme of the United Kingdom
Space advocacy organizations
Space advocacy
Space organizations
1933 establishments in England
Clubs and societies in London
History of the London Borough of Lambeth